Larras Lee is a closed railway station on the closed Molong- Dubbo railway line in New South Wales, Australia. The station opened in 1925 and closed to passenger services in 1974. The station was subsequently demolished and no trace of it remains now. The railway line through Larras Lee officially closed in 1993.

References

Disused regional railway stations in New South Wales
Railway stations in Australia opened in 1925
Railway stations closed in 1974
1974 disestablishments in Australia